Mắm nêm is a sauce made of fermented fish.  Unlike the more familiar nước mắm (fish sauce), mắm nêm is powerfully pungent, similar to shrimp paste.  Many of the regions that produce fish sauce, for example duyên hải miền trung, also produce mắm nêm.  It is commonly mixed with sugar, pineapple, and spices to make a prepared sauce called mắm nêm pha sẵn, the key ingredient in neem sauce.

References
Mam nem on Danang Cuisine
Mam Nem (Vietnamese Fermented Anchovy Dipping Sauce) on Wandering Chopsticks

Vietnamese cuisine
Sauces